Gopalganj may refer to:

Bangladesh
Gopalganj District, Bangladesh, a district of Dhaka Division
Gopalganj, Bangladesh, a town and headquarter of Gopalganj district
Gopalganj Sadar Upazila, an upazila of Gopalganj District
Gopalganj-1, a parliamentary constituency
Gopalganj-2, a parliamentary constituency
Gopalganj-3, a parliamentary constituency

India
 Gopalganj (Lok Sabha constituency), Bihar
 Gopalganj (Vidhan Sabha constituency), Bihar
Gopalganj, Bihar, a town, municipality and headquarters of Gopalganj district
Gopalganj district, India, a district of the state of Bihar
Gopalganj Subdivision, a subdivision of Gopalganj district
Gopalganj, Madhya Pradesh, a village in Madhya Pradesh; see Wainganga River